The Salza is a river of Saxony-Anhalt, Germany. It is a left tributary of the Saale in Salzmünde.

The upper section of the Salza carries the name Querne. Its source is near the village , a district of the town Querfurt. It flows through Querfurt to Obhausen, where it receives its right tributary Weidenbach. Downstream from this confluence, the river carries the name Weida. It continues through Schraplau and Röblingen am See and near Langenbogen it receives water that is pumped out of the lake  (fed by the river Böse Sieben). From this point it carries the name Salza.

See also
List of rivers of Saxony-Anhalt

Rivers of Saxony-Anhalt
Rivers of Germany